Hedsor House is an Italianate-style mansion in the United Kingdom, located in Hedsor in Buckinghamshire. Perched overlooking the River Thames, a manor house at Hedsor can be dated back to 1166 when the estate was owned by the de Hedsor Family. In the 18th century it was a royal residence of Princess Augusta, Dowager Princess of Wales.

History
Hedsor, which dates back to 1166,  was once the home of Princess Augusta, Dowager Princess of Wales, mother of George III and the founder of Kew Gardens. The house and its 85-acre park overlooking the Thames then regularly welcomed the Kings and Queens from Windsor Castle as the home of Lord Boston from 1764.

The house was originally designed by Sir William Chambers, architect of Somerset House in London, with the aid of George III and Queen Charlotte, who picked the location specifically for its position high above the Thames. Badly damaged by fire in 1795, a new house was completed in 1868 by James Knowles, unusually modelled on the Italian villa style but with a domed hall rather than an open courtyard.

King George III and later, Queen Victoria were both frequent visitors, with Baron Boston building the Hedsor Folly to commemorate King George's victory at the Battle of Waterloo in 1815.

Current
The present house was built in the Italianate style. The house is at the end of a kilometre-long private drive in an  estate. The surrounding park is Grade II listed on the English Heritage National Register of Historic Parks and Gardens.

In 1934, Philip and Florence Shephard were given Hedsor House as their wedding present by Philip's father.

In the 1950s, Hedsor House was leased by the US Air Force as a Cold War military spy base.

The 1960s, the house was leased as a conference centre for International Computers Limited (ICL). Management courses were run by ICL with overnight accommodation in rooms in the house and in the stable yard. The company only leased the house and the immediate grounds for parking. The bulk of the site was out of bounds.

The house is now used for weddings and corporate events and run by the 4th generation of the Shephard family.

Hedsor Park
Hedsor Park is the listed historic park that surrounds Hedsor House. Regularly visited by Queen Victoria, Hedsor Park is listed under English Heritage Register of Parks and Gardens of Special Historic Interest in England Grade II.

Parties
The house has hosted many celebrity parties including for David Beckham, Victoria Beckham, Elton John, Jason Statham, George Clooney, Keira Knightley amongst others.

In September 2008, Mark Ronson held his 33rd birthday at Madonna and Guy Ritchie’s pub The Punch Bowl, Mayfair, London, and Hedsor House, including Amy Winehouse, Lily Allen, Daisy Lowe, Nick Grimshaw, and The Kaiser Chiefs.

Filming
The house has been used as a film location for both television dramas and feature films including The Golden Compass and Spooks. It was used to represent The White House in The Special Relationship and Downing Street in The Day of the Triffids. 
It was also used for a MTV reality show The Girls of Hedsor Hall, based on the British reality series Ladette to Lady. and the music videos for Jay Sean's song "Down" and Zara Larsson's song "Ain't My Fault". It featured Tom Hardy in the 2015 film Legend and in 2016 as the mansion to which George Clooney is taken when kidnapped in a Nespresso advert.

Quartet
It was also the location of Quartet, a 2012 comedy drama film directed by Dustin Hoffman, based on the play by Ronald Harwood. It was filmed in its entirety at Hedsor House, in Autumn 2011. The film stars Maggie Smith, Tom Courtenay, Pauline Collins and Billy Connolly. Hedsor House features as "Beecham House", the retirement home for professional musicians.

Mortdecai
Hedsor House was also used as one of the locations for the 2015 film Mortdecai, an action comedy film directed by David Koepp which starred Johnny Depp and Gwyneth Paltrow.

Awards
Hedsor House is registered as a wedding venue. It was included in a list of "Top 10 Regal Wedding Venues in the UK" by The Times.

References

External links

 

Buildings and structures on the River Thames
Country houses in Buckinghamshire
Georgian architecture in England
Grade II listed buildings in Buckinghamshire
Grade II listed houses
Grade II listed parks and gardens in Buckinghamshire
Houses completed in 1868
Italianate architecture in England
William Chambers buildings
Wycombe District